Newcastle Cruise Terminal was a proposed cruise terminal in Newcastle, New South Wales, Australia. The cruise terminal was proposed to be built at the Channel Berth in the Port of Newcastle.

Funding was to be provided by the Government of New South Wales’s Restart NSW Hunter Infrastructure Investment Fund. The project was cancelled in 2019 after Infrastructure NSW advised funding would no longer be available.

References

External links
Newcastle Cruise Terminal at Port of Newcastle website

Proposed buildings and structures in Australia